Henrique (or Enrique) Abranches (September 29, 1932 – August 8, 2004) was an Angolan writer and anthropologist born in Lisbon, Portugal.

Career 
In 1975, he went to Angola, where he acquired citizenship.

With Pepetela, he founded in Algiers the Angolan Studies Center, where they worked at writing a handbook of the history of Angola. After independence, he was committed to cultural intervention. He was a teacher in higher education, besides being a poet, fiction writer, essayist and playwright.

He was also the Director of the National Museum of Slavery, Angola.

Awards 
 National Literature Award (1981) for Konkhava de Féti.
 National Literature Award (1990) for O Clã de Novembrino
Luanda trophy (1997)

References

1932 births
2004 deaths
Angolan male poets
People from Lisbon
20th-century Angolan poets
20th-century male writers
Portuguese emigrants to Angola